The wildlife of Chad is composed of its flora and fauna. Bush elephants, West African lions, buffalo, hippopotamuses, Kordofan giraffes, antelopes, African leopards, cheetahs, hyenas, and many species of snakes are found there, although most large carnivore populations have been drastically reduced since the early 20th century. Elephant poaching, particularly in the south of the country in areas such as Zakouma National Park, is a severe problem.

Vegetation

As of 2011, there were 2,288 species in the country in the country, 55 of which are endemic. Precipitation varies widely from south to the north. The country is also subject to hot, dry, dusty conditions. Harmattan winds are a feature in the northern part of the country. Droughts and locust plagues are also common. The vegetation in the country is broadly categorized under the three regions of the northern Sahara zone, the central Sahel zone, and the southern Sudan zone; all three zones are of equal proportion.

The northern part of the country which has the Sahara desert and which borders Libya and the volcanic massif of Tibesti forms part of the northern zone. Vegetation is dominantly tropical in the tropical zone of the country with deserts having least vegetative growth. However, a large area of desert dunes lie between Lake Chad and the Ouaddai massif, where fringes of xerophytic scrubland is noted.

The montane vegetation on the massif is rich, unlike the vegetation that is in the lowlands. A flat terrain supports Sahelian grasslands. The transition zone that lies between the southern Sahel and northern Sudan–Guinea is also a seasonal wetland. The Sudan Savanna zone mostly consists of Sudanian woodland with intermittent vegetation of edaphic grassland and Acacia.

Lake Chad, lying on the country's western edge and extending across the border into Niger, Nigeria and Cameroon, is one of the richest areas of flora in the country, although it has rapidly reduced in size during the last century. The well-drained soils of the area once supported areas of dense woodlands with ebony and kapok trees, but this has declined due to soil erosion and degradation. Vegetation found in the area includes acacias, baobab, desert date, palms, African myrrh, and Indian jujube. Found within the lake itself are aquatic plants such as reeds, papyrus, ambatch, and water lilies.

Fauna

As of 2002, there were at least 134 species of mammals and 532 species of birds (354 species of residents and 155 migrants) in Chad. Before the 20th century, Chad reportedly had a rich fauna of large carnivores in the Lake Chad region, but due to deforestation, hunting and competition from livestock most of the population of lions, leopards, rhinoceros, and hippopotamus have disappeared from the region.

The Zakouma National Park is an important habitat with the highest number of large mammals. Scimitar horned oryx are seen in the reserves of Chad in significant numbers, mostly in the Ouadi Rime Ouadi Achin Faunal Reserve. Also reported to survive in this reserve are the large population of addax (Addax nasomaculatus) and dama gazelle (Nanger dama).

Other species reported are; red-fronted gazelle, dorcas gazelle (Gazella rufifrons, Gazella dama, Gazella dorcas), patas monkey (Erythrocebus patas), striped hyena (Hyaena hyaena), Sudan cheetah (Acinonyx jubatus soemmeringii), caracal (Felis caracal), and Chadian wild dog (Lycaon pictus sharicus), African elephant (Loxodonta africana), otter (Lutra maculicollis), Aonyx capensis, sitatunga (Tragelaphus spekei) and kob (Kobus kob). Rodent species reported are Mastomys verheyeni and gerbil (Taterillus lacustris). African rock pythons and spitting cobras are the reptile species also reported.

Aquafauna
Lake Chad has 179 species of fish which feed on vegetation, phytoplankton and zooplankton. Some of the species reported are catfish (Clarias gariepensis), tilapia, cichlids, characin (Alestes baremoze) and Nile perch (Lates niloticus). Lungfish and sailfin are the two other unique species in the lake. Crocodile and hippopotamus also inhabit the lake as do birds, and it is an important destination for many migratory species of birds.

Avifauna

BirdLife International has reported 532 species of birds of which 354 residents and 155 are migrants, the Avibase - Bird Checklists of the World reports 587 species including 6 globally threatened species. Of these the species under endangered, near-threatened, and vulnerable categories are:

Critically endangered
Slender-billed curlew (Numenius tenuirostris)

Endangered
Egyptian vulture (Neophron percnopterus)
Hooded vulture (Necrosyrtes monachus)
White-backed vulture (Gyps africanus)
Rueppell's griffon (Gyps rueppellii)
Saker falcon (Falco cherrug)

Vulnerable
Marbled teal (Marmaronetta angustirostris)
Secretary-bird (Sagittarius serpentarius)
White-headed vulture (Trigonoceps occipitalis)
Beaudouin's snake-eagle (Circaetus beaudouini)
Greater spotted eagle (Clanga clanga)
Black crowned-crane (Balearica pavonina)

 Near-threatened
Ferruginous duck (Aythya nyroca)
Bateleur (Terathopius ecaudatus)
Lesser flamingo (Phoenicopterus minor)
Martial eagle (Polemaetus bellicosus)
Pallid harrier (Circus macrourus}
Arabian bustard (Ardeotis arabs)
Stanley bustard {Neotis denhami)
Nubian bustard (Neotis nuba)
Eurasian curlew (Numenius arquata)
Black-tailed godwit (Limosa limosa)
Great snipe (Gallinago media)
Black-winged pratincole (Glareola nordmanni)
African skimmer (Rynchops flavirostris)
European roller (Coracias garrulus)
Red-footed falcon (Falco vespertinus)
Sooty falcon (Falco concolor)

The violet turaco (Musophaga violacea) is a species of least concern, which is found in large numbers in a range of less than  covering many African countries including Chad.

Protection

The protected parks, reserves, protection forests, reforestation areas, and Ramsar wetlands of international importance in the country include the IUCN Level II categorized Aouk (7400 km2), Goz Beïda, Manda (1140 km2), and Zakouma (3000 km2) national parks. The country has a number of faunal reserves which are loosely protected including Abou Telfane (1100 km2), Bahr Salamat (20600 km2), Beinamar (763 km2), Binder-Léré (1350 km2), Fada Archei (2110 km2), Larmanaye (3040 km2), Mandelia (1380 km2), Ouadi Rimé-Ouadi Achim (80,000 km2), and Siniala-Minia (4260 km2) faunal reserves. Aside from the numerous protected forests, Tibesti Massif is also a protected area. The wetlands of international importance (Ramsar) are the Lac Fitri Ramsar Site (1950 km2), Réserve de faune de Binder-Léré Ramsar Site (1350 km2) and the Partie tchadienne du lac Tchad Ramsar Site (16481.68 km2).

Apart from parks and reserves, eight Important Bird Areas have been identified and supported by BirdLife International covering an area of  (11.2% of the area of the country) some of them overlapping with parks and reserves. Of these, the Ouadi Rimé–Ouadi Achim IBA is the largest covering an area of more than 6% of the area of the country.

Conservation
Extensive deforestation has resulted in loss of trees such as acacias, baobab, dates and palm trees. This has also caused loss of natural habitat for wild animals; one of the main reasons for this is also hunting and livestock farming by increasing human settlements. Animals like lions, leopards and rhino have been almost eliminated.

Efforts have been made by the Food and Agriculture Organization to improve relations between farmers, agro-pastoralists and pastoralists in the Zakouma National Park (ZNP), Siniaka-Minia, and Aouk reserve in southeastern Chad to promote sustainable development. As part of the national conservation effort, more than 1.2 million trees have been replanted to check the advancement of the desert, which incidentally also helps the local economy by way of financial return from acacia trees, which produce gum arabic, and also from fruit trees.

Poaching

Poaching is a serious problem in the country, particularly of elephants for the profitable ivory industry and a threat to lives of rangers even in the national parks such as Zakouma. Elephants are often massacred in herds in and around the parks by organized poaching. The problem is worsened by the fact that the parks are understaffed and that a number of wardens have been murdered by poachers.

References

Bibliography

External links
USAID detailed study on "Considerations of Wildlife Resources and Land Use in Chad"

Biota of Chad
Chad